Olga Nybø (born 12 June 1930) is a Norwegian politician for the Christian Democratic Party.

She served as a deputy representative to the Parliament of Norway from Rogaland during the term 1981–1985. In total she met during 26 days of parliamentary session.

References

1930 births
Living people
Christian Democratic Party (Norway) politicians
Deputy members of the Storting
Rogaland politicians
Women members of the Storting
20th-century Norwegian women politicians
20th-century Norwegian politicians